Mythology and folklore of the United Kingdom varies between the separate countries:

 Cornish mythology
 English mythology
 Scottish mythology
 Welsh mythology
 Irish mythology

See also
Anglo-Saxon paganism

References

British folklore
European mythology